Eiki Miyazaki (born 15 March 1955) is a Japanese equestrian. He competed at the 1988 Summer Olympics and the 1992 Summer Olympics.

References

External links
 

1955 births
Living people
Japanese male equestrians
Olympic equestrians of Japan
Equestrians at the 1988 Summer Olympics
Equestrians at the 1992 Summer Olympics
Place of birth missing (living people)
Asian Games medalists in equestrian
Equestrians at the 1986 Asian Games
Asian Games gold medalists for Japan
Asian Games silver medalists for Japan
Medalists at the 1986 Asian Games